The Oxfordshire County Football Association, also simply known as the Oxfordshire FA, is the governing body of football in the county of Oxfordshire.

References

External links

County football associations
Football in Oxfordshire